Passive acoustics is the action of listening for sounds, often at specific frequencies or for purposes of specific analyses.  

As applied to underwater acoustics, also termed hydroacoustics or sonar, passive acoustics can be used to listen for underwater explosions, earthquakes, volcanic eruptions, sounds produced by fish and other animals, vessel activity or aquatic detecting equipment (as in hydroacoustics to track fish).

References 

 David A. Mann, Anthony D. Hawkins, and J. Michael Jech, Active and Passive Acoustics to Locate and Study Fish, from book Fish Bioacoustics: With 81 Illustrations (pp.279-309), April 2008
 Marco Brunoldi, Giorgio Bozzini, et al., A Permanent Automated Real-Time Passive Acoustic Monitoring System for Bottlenose Dolphin Conservation in the Mediterranean Sea, 2016

Ichthyology